Sekai Irene Nzenza Kanhutu is a Zimbabwean writer, cultural critic and politician.

Biography
She was born in rural Zimbabwe, where she trained as a nurse, before doing additional nursing studies in England and subsequently going to live in Australia. She held senior positions in Melbourne and Los Angeles.

Her semi-autobiographical first book, Zimbabwean Woman: My Own Story, was published in 1988. Her book Songs to an African Sunset (1997) describes her return to her family's village in the early 1990s.  She has a Ph.D. in International Relations from the University of Melbourne.

Sekai wrote a weekly column for The Herald newspaper from 2011 to 2018, often returning to the theme of Zimbabweans reclaiming their cultural heritage and village roots. She entered politics as the Member for Chikomba East in Zimbabwe's 2018 harmonised elections. She was appointed as Zimbabwe's Minister of Public Service Labour and Social Welfare on 7 September 2018.

Bibliography
 Zimbabwean Woman: My Own Story, London: Karia Press, 1988. .
 Songs to an African Sunset: A Zimbabwean Story, Lonely Planet Publications, 1997. .

References

External links
 Sekai Nzenza page at The Herald.
 
 
 

1964 births
Living people
Zimbabwean expatriates in England
Zimbabwean expatriates in Australia
University of Melbourne alumni
20th-century Zimbabwean writers
20th-century Zimbabwean women writers
21st-century Zimbabwean writers
21st-century Zimbabwean women writers
Zimbabwean politicians